Methylcobalamin (mecobalamin, MeCbl, or MeB) is a cobalamin, a form of vitamin B. It differs from cyanocobalamin in that the cyano group at the cobalt is replaced with a methyl group. Methylcobalamin features an octahedral cobalt(III) centre and can be obtained as bright red crystals.  From the perspective of coordination chemistry, methylcobalamin is notable as a rare example of a compound that contains metal–alkyl bonds. Nickel–methyl intermediates have been proposed for the final step of methanogenesis.

Methylcobalamin is equivalent physiologically to vitamin B, and can be used to prevent or treat pathology arising from a lack of vitamin B intake (vitamin B12 deficiency).

Methylcobalamin is also used in the treatment of peripheral neuropathy, diabetic neuropathy, and as a preliminary treatment for amyotrophic lateral sclerosis.

Methylcobalamin that is ingested is not used directly as a cofactor, but is first converted by MMACHC into cob(II)alamin. Cob(II)alamin is then later converted into the other two forms, adenosylcobalamin and methylcobalamin for use as cofactors. That is, methylcobalamin is first dealkylated and then regenerated.

According to one author, it is important to treat vitamin B deficiency with hydroxocobalamin or cyanocobalamin or a combination of adenosylcobalamin and methylcobalamin, and not methylcobalamin alone.


Production

Methylcobalamin can be produced in the laboratory by reducing cyanocobalamin with sodium borohydride in alkaline solution, followed by the addition of methyl iodide.

Functions
This vitamer, along with adenosylcobalamin, is one of two active coenzymes used by vitamin B-dependent enzymes and is the specific vitamin B form used by 5-methyltetrahydrofolate-homocysteine methyltransferase (MTR), also known as methionine synthase.
 
Methylcobalamin participates in the Wood-Ljungdahl pathway, which is a pathway by which some organisms utilize carbon dioxide as their source of organic compounds.  In this pathway, methylcobalamin provides the methyl group that couples to carbon monoxide (derived from CO2) to afford acetyl-CoA.  Acetyl-CoA is a derivative of acetic acid that is converted to more complex molecules as required by the organism.

Methylcobalamin is produced by some bacteria. It plays an important role in the environment.  In the environment, it is responsible for the biomethylation of certain heavy metals.  For example, the highly toxic methylmercury is produced by the action of methylcobalamin.  In this role, methylcobalamin serves as a source of "CH3+".

A lack of cobalamin can lead to megaloblastic anemia and subacute combined degeneration of the spinal cord.

See also 
Cobamamide
Cyanocobalamin
Hydroxocobalamin
Vitamin B12
Cobalamin biosynthesis

References 

B vitamins
Cofactors
Methylating agents
Organocobalt compounds
Vitamin B12